The Bar is a 2017 black comedy thriller film directed, produced and co-written by Álex de la Iglesia. Set in Madrid, it has the ensemble cast typical of this director. It was screened out of competition at the 67th Berlin International Film Festival.

Plot
In a cafe in Madrid; two random people are shot dead by an unknown sniper when they leave the bar. The streets are evacuated, and gradually, the rest of the people still alive in the bar come to realize someone in the group is the reason. It becomes clear that it is a government operation and they are covering up the killings under the guise of a fire. Everyone inside the cafe turns against each other. Eventually, a man emerges from the bathroom in a critically diseased condition. He drops to the floor but as the group gathers around to comfort him, he mutters, "Don't touch me!" before dying. It now becomes clear that the group is being quarantined due to the man's disease. Amparo, the shop owner acknowledges the man's last words before dying and keeps five people from the group at bay who made physical contact with the man, including Elena, Nacho, Trini, Sátur, and Israel believing them to be infected. Two others who believe to have made no physical contact with the man including Andrés and Sergio join Amparo and together force the five other people down in the cellar at gunpoint.

Deep down in the cellar, the group talks about random things, until Trini, who is apparently claustrophobic, starts panicking in the small dark cellar. In her panic, she runs up the cellar stairs and slips and falls down on a crate of bottles and breaks several of the bottles. Nacho realizes the liquid from the bottle is not pooling on the cellar floor but instead has seeped down somewhere and when they remove several pieces of cardboard, they uncover the grate leading to the sewer. The grate is removed but the opening to the sewer is very small. So the group covers Israel with olive oil from oil bottles to help him slip through but despite all their attempts, Israel is not able to slip through the sewer opening, and instead he is now stuck there.

They then hear several gunshots coming upstairs from the bar and deduce the government has stormed in and shot Amparo, Andrés and Sergio dead. They are scared and try to stay quiet so that no one realizes that they are in the cellar. The government then sets the bar on fire to disinfect it or perhaps hide all the evidence. The group start coughing as smoke begins to fill the cellar. The group all works together to pull Israel out of the sewer opening as they realize that they will run out of air if the fire in the bar continues and they need the air from the sewer to circulate in the cellar. Trini panics again and touches the door to cellar which is red hot, to push it open and burns her hands.

The group waits till the government is gone and heads upstairs to find the interior of the bar burnt down and taped up from the outside. Nacho finds Sergio's gun and even though it is still hot from the fire, he picks it up and hides it in his pants without telling the others.

Eventually, the group finds the diseased man's phone in the wreckage of the burnt bar and they are able to deduce from his text messages that the man has brought in what they conclude to be four doses of vaccine made for the man's disease that have supposedly infected the group.

Israel finds the vaccines in the bathroom, but when the rest of the group urges Israel to share them, he reminds them that the four vaccines are not enough for the five of them, meaning someone in the group will remain unvaccinated. Elena suggests they split the four doses equally amongst the five of them but Nacho says then the vaccine wouldn't be effective. Unwilling to take any chances, Israel deliberately takes out one of the doses, the group sees this and Nacho pulls out the gun and tells him to stop but Israel continues to inject himself with the vaccine. Furious, Nacho engages in a physical fight with Israel. However, Israel ultimately gets the upper hand in the fight, beats Nacho badly, and manages to get the gun off Nacho. Israel uses the gun to threaten the rest of the group.

In the ensuing fight, the rest of the vaccines end up falling down into the cellar. Trini runs down to pick it up and instead ends up dropping it through the sewer opening and down into the sewers.

Now in order to get the vaccines, Elena strips down to her undergarments and is covered with oil. After much pushing and some injury and discomfort, she is able to slip through the sewer opening. She finds the vaccines container but refuses to send the vaccines back up to the group. She says that they will use the vaccines amongst themselves and not leave any for her if she sends it up. She says she will not use the vaccine herself yet but if the rest of the group wants the vaccine, they will have to come down to the sewer as she did.

Nacho grabs a huge metal pipe and the men all take turns in making the sewer opening larger. They cover themselves with oil and Nacho, Israel, Satur, and Trini barely manage to squeeze through the small opening to access the sewers. While they are all trying to come down to the sewer, Elena explores the sewer a bit and hides the vaccine in a safe location.

Once the whole group is down in the sewers, Nacho suddenly grabs Israel and attempts to fight and drown him underwater and also get the gun away from him. The two men are submerged for some time and the group suddenly hears two gunshots with flashes underwater. After some time it is Nacho who emerges from the sewer water, gasping for air and holding onto the gun.

The group is still left with the question of who is going to be left out to be vaccinated. Elena, Trini, and Satur fear Nacho as they think he killed Israel. Nacho also becomes aggressive towards them, threatening to shoot Satur if Elena does not hand over the vaccines. They are able to talk him down and Elena starts to lead the way to where she hid the vaccine. While walking on the way there, it is very dark and Satur slips and falls into the water. Instead of helping him up, Trini holds and forces his head underwater to drown him so that there is no more competition for the vaccine. Elena asks Nacho to shoot the gun so they can use the light to see what's going on. In the flash of the gunshot, they see Trini holding Satur underwater. Trini stops and tries to justify her actions. Nacho says that he will shoot her instead and holds the gun to her head but is ultimately unable to do it. Trini has a moment of realization about the pointlessness of her whole life and so she takes the gun from him and kills herself to minimize the group's quantity with that of the vaccines.

Elena takes Satur and Nacho to where she hid the vaccines. They take the vaccines out but before they can inject themselves they hear a clinking sound of coins being thrown. They go back to investigate and see Trini's dead body with coins placed over her eyes.

While the three are looking at Trini's body, a now demented Israel comes out of the shadows and hits Satur on the head with a metal pipe and kills him. Israel chases after Elena and Nacho through the sewers. He is mostly only after Nacho as Nacho is the one who fought with him and tried to drown him earlier.

Nacho and Elena run and find a ladder to escape from the sewers. Elena starts climbing the ladder with Nacho just behind her. Israel catches up and grabs hold of Nacho but Nacho manages to kick him off. Elena and Nacho continue to climb up but Israel is climbing fast and grabs a tight hold of Nacho. During this struggle, Elena drops her dose of the vaccine down into the sewer. Nacho tells her to grab his hand and gives her his dose of the vaccine just before Israel pulls him down the ladder and back into the sewer, resulting in both being killed. Distraught, Elena injects herself with the vaccine and pushes open the grate before climbing out of the sewers and into the streets, where she sees the bar burnt down from the outside. Nevertheless, she walks away from the scene and into the crowd.

Cast

References

External links
 
 
 

2017 films
2017 black comedy films
2017 thriller films
2010s comedy thriller films
2010s Spanish-language films
Argentine black comedy films
Argentine comedy thriller films
Atresmedia Cine films
Films directed by Álex de la Iglesia
Films set in Madrid
Films shot in Madrid
Films with screenplays by Jorge Guerricaechevarría
Pokeepsie Films films
Spanish black comedy films
Spanish comedy thriller films
2010s Spanish films
2010s Argentine films